The British Railways (BR) ex-WD Austerity 2-8-0 was a class of 733 2-8-0 steam locomotives designed for heavy freight.  These locomotives of the WD Austerity 2-8-0 type had been constructed by the War Department as war locomotives 1943-1945.  After the war they were surplus and so in 1946 the LNER bought 200 of them, classifying them as LNER Class O7, and by the end of 1947 when the LNER was nationalised, had taken another 278 O7s on loan.  After nationalisation, BR purchased 533 more 2-8-0s, including all of those on loan, giving a class total of 733.  As many of these needed overhauling before being put to work, they were activated slowly.  BR chose to reclassified from LNER Class O7 and renumbered them from the 6xxxx LNER series in the 90000-732 series for BR standard designs.

Naming
90732 was named Vulcan after the Vulcan Foundry.

Classification

BR considered them as standard classes, numbering them in the numbering series allocated for BR standard classes, assigned them the boiler diagram BR10; while their tenders were assigned the diagram BR5.  BR built 53 new boilers at Crewe between 1951 and 1954.

Operation
The class were used almost entirely on freight services, and were always unusual on passenger work. Well over half the total number were always on the former LNER system, from East Anglia up to Scotland, and there was also a large number across the former Lancashire & Yorkshire railway depots. Some were initially used on the Southern Region, but later left there, while another smaller group was on the Western Region for much of their lives. The Scottish ones later spread from just the ex-LNER lines across the rest of the Region.

Accidents and incidents
On 16 January 1958, locomotive 90277 was standing foul of the line at  when it was run into by a passenger train due to a signalman's error. The passenger train was derailed, 90277 ended up on its side. Thirteen people were injured.

Withdrawal 

The engines were withdrawn from service as follows:

Preservation 

None of the BR Austerity 2-8-0s was preserved. However, one Austerity 2-8-0 (out of a total of 935 engines) has survived; WD No. 79257. This has returned to Britain via the Netherlands and Sweden, and has been restored to original condition and given the "BR number" 90733. It is based at the Keighley and Worth Valley Railway.

See also
 BR ex-WD Austerity 2-10-0
 WD Austerity 2-8-0

References 

 Roger Tourret Allied Military Locomotives of the Second World War
Willie Yeadon, Yeadon's Register of LNER Locomotives Vol.15: Class J94, O6, and O7 the engines from the years of expediency. Challenger, 1999

Notes

2-8-0 locomotives
War Department locomotives
NBL locomotives
Vulcan Foundry locomotives
Railway locomotives introduced in 1943
Standard gauge steam locomotives of Great Britain
Steam locomotives of the Netherlands
Steam locomotives of Sweden
Standard gauge locomotives of the Netherlands
Standard gauge locomotives of Sweden
Scrapped locomotives
Freight locomotives